The Art of Fingerstyle Jazz Guitar is an album by American guitarist Duck Baker that was released in 1979. It was reissued in 1994 by  Shanachie Records with six bonus tracks.

Reception

Writing for Allmusic, music critic Richard Foss wrote of the album "Although it may seem unlikely that Baker alone can do justice to pieces that were written for a full band, his versions of tunes like "Take the 'A' Train" and "Stompin' at the Savoy" are surprisingly effective. While the ringing tones may be absent, the warmth and polyrhythms that come from adroit fingerpicking give this recording a warmth and character that is far from the sound-alike herd of flashy fusion guitar players… To put it more succinctly, if you don't have this CD, you probably need it."

Track listing

Personnel
Duck Baker – acoustic guitar, liner notes
Production notes:
Stefan Grossman – producer, photography
Nic Kinsey – engineer
John Verity – engineer
Ron Cosford – photography

References

External links
The Art of Fingerstyle Jazz Guitar at Duck Baker official web site

1979 albums
Duck Baker albums
Kicking Mule Records albums